This is a list of cities, towns and villages in Somalia.

Aadan Yabaa
Hanan nagamous
Abaareey
Abudwak
Adado
Derri
Bargaan
Jacar
Afgooye
Afmadow
Baidoa
Balcad
Ballidagaruen
Balli Dhiddin
Bandar Beyla
Bandiiradley
Barawa
Bardera
Beeli Wacatay
Beledhawo
bacaadwayn
bashbash
Buloburde
Buqdaaqable
Berhani
Beyra
Bibi
Bu'aale
Bur Saalax
Buulo burte
Buulo Xaaji
Burane
Burco
Burgaban
Burtinle
Buurdhuubo
Buurhakaba
Ceeldheer
Cadale
Cabdullekudaad
Ceel-Baraf
Caadley
Cadaley
Ceel-Aweyn
Ceel Huur
Ceelbuur
Ceel Cali
Ceelmakoile
Colgula
Daharro
Dalweyn
Dangorayo
Danan (volcano)
Dhalwo
Dhamasa
Dharoor
Dhuusamarreeb
Diinsoor
Dinowda
Docol
Doolow
Duulin Maaxato
Eyl
Fafahdun
Galcad
Galhareeri
Galinsoor
Galkayo
Garacad
Garbahaarreey
Garoowe
Geerisa Awdal
Godinlabe
Godobjiran
Goldogob
Goroyo-Cawl
Guriel
Guud Cad
Habo
Hafun
Harardhere
Hareeri
Heraale
Hobyo
Hudur
Hoosingo
Iskushuban
Jalalaqsi
Jamaame
Jana Cabdalle
Jariban
Jilib
Jowhar
Jiifyarey
Jilyaale
Karin
Kulanxagay
Kismayo
Laag
Lanwaley
Laas Dawaco
Luuq
Leego
Mahadaay Weyn
Maraay Suuley
Mareergur
marwa foto weyn
Mareeg
Merca
Messego Waay
Mogadishu
Mohamed Haji
Mubaarak
Qandala
Qardho
Qarxis
Qaan Dhoole
Qansahdhere
Qarhis
Qoryoley
Qori lugud
Rako Raaxo
Ras Kamboni
Rigomane
Roox
Ruun Nirgood
Saacow
Shadia dhimo
Saylac
Sheerbi
Tadba
Taleex
Tile
Turdho
Ufeyn
Wabho
Waiye
Wajid
Warsheikh
Weeraar
Wisil
Wobxo
Xamure
Xabaalo Barbar
Xerojaale
Xiddo
Yake

See also

 List of cities in Somalia by population
 List of cities in East Africa

References
National Geospatial-Intelligence Agency - Geographical areas in Somalia

Somalia
 
Somalia geography-related lists
Somalia